Zakarias Tallroth is a Swedish wrestler.

Tollroth was a bronze medalist at the 2015 World Wrestling Championships in Men's Greco-Roman 71 kg.

His father, Roger Tallroth was an Olympic silver medalist and European champion.

References 

Living people
Swedish male sport wrestlers
European Games competitors for Sweden
World Wrestling Championships medalists
Wrestlers at the 2015 European Games
Date of birth missing (living people)
Year of birth missing (living people)